WNEZ (1230 AM) is a radio station broadcasting a Spanish Variety format. Licensed to Manchester, Connecticut, United States, the station serves the Hartford-New Britain-Middletown area. The station is owned by Gois Broadcasting of Connecticut, LLC.

History
What is now WNEZ signed on the air on August 12, 1936 as WTHT, owned by the Hartford Times newspaper, and broadcast on 1200 kHz. Studios, offices and transmitter were in the Industrial Building at 983 Main Street in Hartford. The station had 100 watts of power. Initially, the station was on a daytime schedule. In 1938, it acquired the operating hours of a Rhode Island station that never signed on. WTHT moved to 1230 on March 29, 1941, in accordance with the NARBA. By this time, the power had increased to 250 watts full-time.

Originally an affiliate of the Colonial and Mutual Networks, it later affiliated with the Yankee Network. On December 1, 1945, the facilities were moved to 555 Asylum Avenue. Simultaneously, WTHT affiliated with the American Broadcasting Company, which lasted until the station went silent. The Yankee-Mutual affiliation passed to WHTD (now WPOP). That station was owned by The Yankee Network.

When WTHT merged with WONS on February 14, 1954, it morphed into WGTH. The ABC affiliation went to the new station. In 1956, WGTH became WPOP. WTHT's studios and control room were converted for television use for the new WGTH-TV, which began operations in the summer of 1954.

The 1230 frequency was dormant until 1958, when a new station, WINF, took to the air. Studios were located in Manchester. There is no relationship between the two stations except for the frequency.

In the 1980s, the studios were moved to Wethersfield Avenue in Hartford. In 1994, the studios were moved to the 4th floor of a building on Cedar Street in Hartford, and the station operated with a Spanish language format under new ownership. In 1999, Alfredo Alonso's Mega Broadcasting purchased the station for $575,000 from Jeffrey Dressler. The station moved again in 2000, this time to 330 Main Street where they joined station WLAT. In 2002, Freedom Communications purchased both stations. Ownership changed again in 2007 to Gois, and the studios moved to East Hartford.

Translators

References

External links

NEZ
Manchester, Connecticut
Mass media in Hartford County, Connecticut
Radio stations established in 1958
1958 establishments in Connecticut